Conscience clause or conscientious objection/objector may refer to:
 Conscience clause (education)
 Conscientious objection to abortion
 Conscientious objector (in the military)
 Conscience clause in medicine in the United States